Augustów Governorate was an administrative unit (governorate) of Congress Poland.

It was created in 1837 from the Augustów Voivodship, and had the same borders and capital (Suwałki) as the voivodship. In 1867 territories of the Augustów Governorate and the Płock Governorate were divided into a smaller Płock Governorate, Suwałki Governorate (consisting mostly of the Augustów Governorate territories) and recreated Łomża Governorate.

Administrative divisions
It was divided into 7 powiats:
Biebrzańsk County (seat in Szczuczyn)
Dąbrowski County (seat in Lipsk, later in Augustów)
Kalvarija County
Łomża County
Marijampolė County
Tykociń County
Wigierski-Sejny County (seat in Sejny)

After 1918, the southern one-third of the governorate was included in Poland, the rest falling to Lithuania.

References
Geographical Dictionary of the Kingdom of Poland

Governorates of Congress Poland
Establishments in Congress Poland